The third-generation Volkswagen Passat, known as Volkswagen Passat B3 or Volkswagen Passat 35i, was introduced in March 1988 in Europe, 1989 in North America, and 1995 in South America; it was also briefly available in Australia in 1991, when a total of 14 Passat GL 16V in sedan and wagon versions were sold by then importer TKM. Unlike the previous two generations of the Passat, the B3 was not available as a fastback - only 4-door sedan and 5-door station wagon versions were available, setting the precedent for the model for all subsequent generations to date.  Its curvy looks were a contrast from the boxy appearance of its predecessor and owed much to the "jelly mould" style pioneered by Ford with the Sierra and Taurus. The lack of a grille, utilizing the bottom breather approach, made the car's front end styling reminiscent of older, rear-engined Volkswagens such as the 411, and also doubled as a modern styling trend. The styling was developed from the 1981 aerodynamic (cd = 0.25) Auto 2000 concept car.

At the time it was the first Passat to be built on a Volkswagen-designed platform, rather than sharing one with an Audi saloon. The Passat B3 was designed by Volkswagen's design chief, Herbert Schäfer and, unlike equivalent Audi models, now featured a space-saving transversely mounted engine (a configuration from which future Passat models would retreat in 1996).  A couple of weeks ahead of launch, press reports appeared that the forthcoming new Passat was known within the company as the first "true Hahn model" ("erster echter Hahn"), even though Carl Hahn junior had by this time already been the Volkswagen Group's chairman since 1982.   The message, reflecting management priorities at the time, was that whereas recent new models from Volkswagen had unapologetically appeared to be rebadged and mildly rebodied Audis, with this model Volkswagen under Hahn now had the confidence to reassert a more distinctive identity for its cars, differentiating the Audi and Volkswagen brands more persuasively from one another in the process.

The car, although designated B3 in Volkswagen's platform nomenclature, was based largely on the A platform as used for the smaller Golf Mk2 model, but was stretched in all directions. Many components are shared directly between these vehicles.  It was marketed under the Passat name in all markets; in North America, this was a first.

The fuel injected petrol engines gave better performance and refinement than the previously used carbureted units. They were mounted transversely, and the floorpan was engineered to accept Volkswagen's "Syncro" four-wheel drive system. Engine options were the 2.0-litre 16-valve engine (for North America only in the GL model), 1.8-litre eight-valve and 16-valve engines (not available in North America; all CLs, GLs, and GLSs had the 2.0 16v), Volkswagen's new 2.8-litre VR6 engine (also used in the Golf and Corrado) in the GL/GT (Europe) and GLX/GLS (North America) models (introduced in 1991 in Europe and 1992 in North America), and the G60 engine (only available on the Syncro model in Canada for the North American market). The 1.6-litre (not available in North America) and 1.9-litre (available only in Canada and Europe) diesel engines were also available as an option.

As somewhat rare features for the time, the B3 Passat was optionally offered with rear self-levelling air suspension, and electronically regulated air conditioning (called "Climatronic").  These two options were available only in Europe.

Technical Data

See also 
 Volkswagen Passat
 Volkswagen Passat (B4)

References

External links 

 Volkswagen Passat GT G60 Syncro 35i, Mk3 year 1990

Passat B3
Cars introduced in 1988
1980s cars 
1990s cars 
Cars powered by VR engines
Station wagons
Cars discontinued in 1993